Daniele Tei (30 June 1946 – 17 September 2011) was an Italian Air Force general. He served as Chief of Staff of the Italian Air Force from 30 January 2008 to 25 February 2010.

References 

1946 births
2011 deaths
Place of birth missing
Italian aviators
Italian Air Force generals